The Summer War (Estonian: Suvesõda) was the occupation of Estonia during the Second World War. It was fought between the Forest Brothers (Metsavennad), the Omakaitse, and the Wehrmacht's 18th Army against the forces of the 8th Army of the USSR and the NKVD.

Background 
On June 17, 1940, the USSR occupied Estonia and on August 6, Estonia became a Soviet Socialist Republic. Estonian civilians and potential Soviet opponents were repressed and sent to prison camps and settlements in the Soviet Union during the deportation in June.

Invasion 
When the Third Reich invaded the Soviet Union on June 22, 1941, some Estonians hoped that the Germans would liberate the Baltics from Soviet rule. The Army Group Nord, led by Marshal General Wilhelm Ritter von Leeb, invaded Estonia. In Northern Estonia, the Soviets' Destruction battalions fiercely defended the area, and it was the last to be occupied by Germany, Around 12,000 partisans of the Estonian Forest Brothers attacked the NKVD forces and the 8th Army. After the German 18th Army crossed the Estonian southern border on July 7–9; the Forest Brothers organized  bigger units. They took on the 8th Army units and destruction battalions at Antsla on 5 July 1941.

Kautla Massacre 

In the Kautla Massacre, twenty civilians were murdered and many were tortured before they were killed. The proportion of destroyed properties to murdered civilians was because the Finnish volunteer group commanded by Henn-Ants Kurg named the ‘Erna long-range reconnaissance' broke the Red Army's blockade and evacuated civilians.

Liberation of territory 
On July 6, 1941, a larger offensive happened in Vastseliina where the Forest Brothers prevented Soviet destruction of the town and trapped the extermination battalion chiefs and local communist administrators. On July 7, the Forest Brothers were able to hoist the Estonian flag in Vasteliina. Võru was subsequently liberated and the Forest Brothers reorganised into the Omakaitse militia.

The battle of Tartu lasted for two weeks and destroyed a large part of the city. Under the leadership of Friedrich Kurg, the Forest Brothers drove the Soviets out, behind the Pärnu River – Emajõgi River line and secured southern Estonia by July 10.[need quotation to verify] The NKVD murdered 193 people in a Tartu Prison on their retreat on July 8

The 18th Army resumed their advance in Estonia by collaborating with the Forest Brothers. The joint Estonian-German forces took Narva on 17 August.

Capture of Tallinn 
By the end of August, Tallinn was surrounded, while in the harbor was the majority of USSR's Baltic Fleet. On August 19, the final German assault on Tallinn began. The joint Estonian-German forces took the city on August 28. The Soviet evacuation of Tallinn carried heavy losses. On that day, the Red flag was taken down on Pikk Hermann was replaced with the flag of Estonia. After the Soviets were driven out from Estonia, German troops disarmed the Forest Brother groups. The Estonian flag was replaced shortly with the flag of Germany.

Operation Beowulf 
On September 8, German and Estonian units launched Operation Beowulf to clear Soviet forces from the West Estonian archipelago. They launched a series of diversionary attacks to confuse and distract the Soviet defenders.  By October 21, the Islands were captured

Costs of the war

Civilian casualties 

Alongside the battle against the partisan group and the Soviet forces and the reintroduction of the Scorched Earth policy, the NKVD committed acts of terror against the civilian population, burning buildings, because their occupants were seen as co-conspirators. Thousands of other civilians were killed, while many towns, schools, services, and other buildings were torched. In August 1941, the whole population of Viru-Kabala were killed, including a six-day-old infant and a two year old child. The Soviets' Destruction battalions also occasionally burned people alive. Overall, the battalions killed 1,850 unarmed civilians or partisans.

Physical damage 
During the fires of July 12-3, the headquarters of the Estonian Defence League, the campus of the Faculty of Veterinary and Agriculture of the University of Tartu and more university buildings were burnt down. Several libraries of the university and 135 major private libraries were destroyed, totalling 465,000 books, many archive materials and 2,500 pieces of art. Among them were the libraries of Aino and Gustav Suits and Aurora and Johannes Semper.

3,237 farms were destroyed, while 13,500 buildings were destroyed. Compared to 1939, in 1942, animal populations decline: horses were down 14% , dairy cattle were down 34%, pigs were down 50%, sheep were down 46%  and fowl were down 27.5%. Many supplies were looted for use in the Soviet Union.

Result 
After the Summer War, the Wehrmacht troops entered the Soviet Union via the Baltics and conscripted Estonians to be part of the 20th Waffen Grenadier Division of the SS, the 15th Waffen Grenadier Division of the SS, and the 19th Waffen Grenadier Division of the SS.

References 

Estonia in World War II
Campaigns of World War II
Military history of Germany during World War II
Estonia–Germany relations